Caroline Wichern (12 September 1836 – 7 May 1906) was a German music educator and composer.

Biography
Caroline Wichern was the eldest daughter of the Protestant theologian and social reformer Johann Hinrich Wichern. She wrote and published songs including a collection of Christmas songs, and was associated with Johannes Brahms. She worked until 1895 as a music teacher at Ellerslie College in Manchester, a school for kindergarten teachers. She was instrumental in popularizing the Christmas song "Stille Nacht" in England.

References

1836 births
1906 deaths
German Romantic composers
Women classical composers
German music educators
19th-century German musicians
Women music educators
20th-century women composers
19th-century women composers